Christopher Saab (born 22 December 1981) is a Lebanese international former rugby league footballer who played as a  forward. He represented  at the 2017 Rugby League World Cup.

Playing career
Saab played junior rugby league for St Johns Lakemba. He played S. G. Ball Cup for the St. George Dragons and Jersey Flegg Cup for the Sydney Roosters.

During his senior career, he played for the Roosters, the South Sydney Rabbitohs, and the North Sydney Bears in the Premier League; Mounties, the Sydney Bulls, and the Guildford Owls in the Ron Massey Cup; and also one season for the Cessnock Goannas in Newcastle.

Representative career
Saab met and became close friends with Robbie Farah in 2002, making their debut for  together in a one-off match against .

Saab was named at second-row in Lebanon's opening game of the 2017 World Cup, also against France, but was ruled out after sustaining a concussion during the warm-up. He retired at the end of the tournament with a total of 15 caps for Lebanon.

References

External links
League Unlimited profile
(archived by web.archive.org) Statistics at rlwc2017.com

1981 births
Living people
Australian rugby league players
Australian people of Lebanese descent
Cessnock Goannas players
Lebanon national rugby league team captains
Lebanon national rugby league team players
North Sydney Bears players
Rugby league second-rows